Charles Elzer Loudermilk (July 7, 1927 – January 26, 2011), known professionally as Charlie Louvin, was an American country music singer and songwriter. He is best known as one of the Louvin Brothers, and was a member of the Grand Ole Opry since 1955.

Biography
Born in Section, Alabama, Louvin was one of seven children and grew up working on the family farm in nearby Henagar. He started singing when he was eight years old.

Louvin began singing professionally with his brother Ira as a teenager on local radio programs in Chattanooga, Tennessee. The boys sang traditional and gospel music in the harmony style they had learned while performing in their church's choir.

After Charlie left the act briefly in 1945 to serve in the Army Air Forces during World War II, the brothers moved first to Knoxville and later to Memphis, working as postal clerks by day, while making appearances in the evening. Another brief disbandment due to Charlie's service in the Korean War led to the brothers' relocation to Birmingham, Alabama.

Primarily known as gospel artists, the Louvins were convinced by a sponsor, "you can't sell tobacco with gospel music," and began adding secular music to their repertoire. They began making appearances on the famed Grand Ole Opry during the 1950s, becoming official members in 1955. The Louvin Brothers released numerous singles, such as "When I Stop Dreaming", with over 20 recordings reaching the country music charts. Their rich harmonies served as an influence for later artists, such as Emmylou Harris, Gram Parsons, and The Byrds.

By the 1960s, Charlie and Ira's popularity had waned and the brothers split up in 1963. In 1965, Ira was killed in a car accident. Charlie continued to perform solo, making numerous appearances on the Grand Ole Opry and in later years acting as an elder statesman for country music.

In 2001, the Louvin Brothers were inducted into the Country Music Hall of Fame.

In the 2000s, Charlie had begun rebuilding his career. Although he readily admitted he was never much of a writer, Louvin released a disc of classics containing one new song, a tribute to Ira, and a gospel album on Tompkins Square Records produced by Mark Nevers. The songs mainly pair Louvin with other singers, such as George Jones, Jeff Tweedy of Wilco, Alex McManus of Bright Eyes, Elvis Costello, and Derwin Hinson. He also wrote two songs with Rockabilly Hall of Famer Colonel Robert Morris, one of which is on Morris' trucking CD, Highway Hero.

, Louvin lived in Manchester, Tennessee. He closed his Louvin Brothers museum in Nashville and was looking to open another one in Monteagle, Tennessee, near Chattanooga. He was a cousin of songwriter John D. Loudermilk.

After his July 2010 cancer surgery, Louvin made his first public appearance, and second to last, at Nashville's Americana Music Conference, Sept. 10th. He performed with Emmylou Harris and longtime Harris and Gram Parsons accompanist Al Perkins on steel guitar.

Louvin made one final public appearance on RFD-TV's The Marty Stuart Show, alongside his son, Sonny Louvin. He performed "See the Big Man Cry", after which country music icon Connie Smith spoke of her admiration for Louvin, before performing "I Don't Love You Anymore". Leroy Troy, alongside Lester Armistead and Dan Kelly, then performed "Bald Knob, Arkansas", which was written by Charlie's brother, Ira Louvin. Marty Stuart and his Fabulous Superlatives then performed the Louvin Brothers gospel song "The Family Who Prays". The show then closed with Louvin singing the Tom T. Hall song "Back When We Were Young", with Stuart accompanying him on mandolin.
The show aired on January 29, 2011, three days after Louvin's death. The show ended with a memorial message: 
"This episode was taped on December 2, 2010. It was to be Mr. Louvin's last televised performance."

Louvin underwent surgery for pancreatic cancer on July 22, 2010. Doctors expected a full recovery, but "the surgery did not go as planned," according to Louvin's son Sonny, and "he will begin using alternative methods of treatment, going forward". Louvin died from its complications in the early morning of January 26, 2011, in his Wartrace, Tennessee, home, aged 83.

Discography

Albums

Singles

References
Footnotes

Works cited
Gutterman, Jimmy. (1998). "The Louvin Brothers". In The Encyclopedia of Country Music. Paul Kingsbury, Editor. New York: Oxford University Press. pp. 305–6.

External links
Charlie Louvin interview - July 2010 www.AwaitngTheFlood.com
State of Mind - A Word with Charlie Louvin - January 2009
Charlie's life from 1927 to the present on Raised Country! 

1927 births
2011 deaths
American country singer-songwriters
American male singer-songwriters
People from DeKalb County, Alabama
Grand Ole Opry members
United States Army Air Forces personnel of World War II
American military personnel of the Korean War
Deaths from pancreatic cancer
Deaths from cancer in Tennessee
People from Wartrace, Tennessee
Country musicians from Tennessee
Country musicians from Alabama
Capitol Records artists
Singer-songwriters from Alabama
Singer-songwriters from Tennessee